The 1999 FAI 1000 was an endurance race for V8 Supercars. The event was held on 14 November 1999 at the Mount Panorama Circuit just outside Bathurst, New South Wales, Australia and was the thirteenth and final round of the 1999 Shell Championship Series.  It was the first year that the traditional spring endurance race at Bathurst was part of the Australian Touring Car Championship.

The race was the third running of the "Australia 1000", first held after the organisational split over the Bathurst 1000 that occurred in 1997. 1999 was the 37th consecutive year in which a touring car endurance race was held at the Mount Panorama Circuit and the event was the 42nd race that traces its lineage back to the 1960 Armstrong 500 held at Phillip Island.

Entry list
57 cars entered the race, the first full field (55 cars or more) since 1990. Alongside the outright contenders, the "Privateers Cup" was contested by 28 Level 2 and 3 licence holders who competed in the sprint rounds of the 1999 season. 20 Ford Falcons (12 AUs and 8 ELs) and 37 Holden Commodores (15 VTs, 21 VSs and 1 VP) were entered in the event. Owen Parkinson Racing, one of the 57 entries, withdrew their Commodore VS prior to the event.

Paul Dumbrell made history as the youngest race starter (since surpassed by Cameron Waters in 2011) at 17 years, 2 months and 14 days; surpassing Bryan Sala's record (set in 1991) by a single day. Of the 114 drivers, only John Cleland came from outside Australia and New Zealand. Three-time 'Great Race' winner Dick Johnson made both his 26th and final Bathurst start.

Report
For the first time the Bathurst 1000 was a round of the Australian Touring Car Championship and drivers had to now focus not only on winning the biggest race of the year, but also had to take into consideration their championship standings. Pushing too hard for a win and ending in the wall could prove detrimental for the championship, especially with Bathurst being the last race. Craig Lowndes entered the race with a 54-point lead over Russell Ingall, 172 on Garth Tander, 226 on Glenn Seton and 250 on team-mate Mark Skaife, with 300 points on offer for the race winner. With Ingall and Larry Perkins not quite on pace and a rare mistake when Larry missed the call from his crew to pit in under an early safety car, along with a tyre puncture, Lowndes' 2nd place with Cameron McConville was more than enough to secure him his 3rd and final title, the Holden Racing Team staging a 2-3 formation finish.

In 1998 Jason Bright crashed the #4 car in practice, and with great strategy and good driving won the race – but begun the 1999 edition in the same fashion as Bright once again crashed, this time at McPhillamy Park. However early in the race in the packed pitlane caused chaos under an early safety car, with Craig Baird dragging the pit boom for the #4 car down pitlane after a mistake from the team. Further technical problems during the race on ended any chance of them repeating their 1998 success.

A record entry in the V8 Supercars era of 57 cars (one unlikely to be broken) had to be whittled down to the track maximum of 55 for the race, yet in the first half of the race the attrition from driver mistakes was still as prevalent as ever and the safety car received a lot of running. FAI Insurance had a $100,000 prize if the winner could break the 1991 race record, however thanks to a then-record 10 safety cars they got nowhere near it – FAI did give Mark Larkham a consolation $25,000 for getting pole position.

Larkham broke not just the V8 track record but Neil Allen's 1970 pre-Chase record in qualifying that he set in a Formula 5000 car. In the race their engine let go before half distance. Garth Tander was another frontrunner, but crashed into Tomas Mezera when he suffered an oil leak-induced spin. Simon Wills was leading in John Faulkner's car mid-race but spun going into the Cutting and found the wall. John Bowe got the underdog PAE Motorsport Falcon as high as 5th before engine failure put he and six-time winner Jim Richards out of the race. David Brabham had a rear tyre explode entering the Chase which saw the Wayne Gardner Racing car lift up into the air then spin around, luckily not collecting any of the cars around him as he flew back over the track and ended up half parked in the sandtrap.

Paul Radisich and Steve Ellery dominated most of the race in the #18 car, with Radisich on course for victory but with 20 laps to go clipped a slower car and received a puncture, damaging the front bodywork as he went over the kerbs entering pitlane. The bodywork damage would later block the radiator and put the Dick Johnson Racing Falcon out with overheating issues, Radisich parking the AU on Mountain Straight. Greg Murphy and Steven Richards both won their 2nd Bathurst 1000, Richards becoming the first driver to win Bathurst in both a Ford and a Holden. They started the race in 12th but quickly floated towards the front of the field, and were the closest challengers to Radisich and Ellery all race.

It would be the last of 26 starts for 3-time winner Dick Johnson, who also made his 21st Top 10 shootout – a record having taken part in all shootouts (excluding 1998) since 1978. His co-driver and son Steven had been racing for a podium against Paul Morris with about 50 laps to go before spinning at the Chase, but was able to keep going and Dick finished his Bathurst career in 4th place. Long-time privateer Alan “Scotty” Taylor made his last of 18 starts, with his 7-year-old Commodore retiring very early on with engine failure.

The race would see the debuts of both 2012 winner Paul Dumbrell (breaking the record for youngest starter in the 1000 at the time) and runner-up Dean Canto, however both were out of the race inside 50 laps having been involved in (separate) crashes. Paul Morris received the "Rookie of the Year" award despite having made multiple starts in the race previously.

Geoff Full and Rodney Forbes won the Privateer's Cup, and even led a few laps during the race on an alternate strategy before being spun out by John Bowe. Cameron McLean and John Cleland were on track to win the class but a crash heading to Reid Park ended their day prematurely, unceremoniously caught in the background of the telecast.

Results

Pre-qualifying
A 1-hour pre-qualifying session was held on Thursday morning to reduce the field to 55 cars. All cars outside the top 30 in the championship were required to take part or risk failing to qualify.

 – Car #33 was withdrawn from the event prior to qualifying, allowing Car #81 to return to the field.

Practice

Qualifying

Top ten shootout

Starting grid

Race

References

Statistics
 Provisional Position – #5 Glenn Seton – 2:10.2560
 Pole Position – #10 Mark Larkham – 2:09.5146
 Fastest Lap – #18 Paul Radisich – 2:12.5624
 Average Speed – 145 km/h

External links
 Official V8 Supercar website
 CAMS Manual reference to Australian titles
 Race results
 Race images

Motorsport in Bathurst, New South Wales
FAI 1000